Ernst von Grünigen (born 23 March 1950 – June 1992) was a Swiss ski jumper who competed from 1971 to 1977.  He finished fifth in the individual normal hill event at the 1976 Winter Olympics in Innsbruck which was also his best career finish.

External links
 
Ernst von Grünigen's profile at Sports Reference.com

1950 births
1992 deaths
Ski jumpers at the 1972 Winter Olympics
Ski jumpers at the 1976 Winter Olympics
Swiss male ski jumpers
Olympic ski jumpers of Switzerland
Ernst